Night Stop is a 1963 Australian television play. It was filmed in Melbourne and had been performed on British TV.

Plot
In a Midlands market town on the River Trent, a young bargeman, Eddy, is determined to learn the truth about the death of his friend, Frank. He believes the truth can be found in the Midlands market town on the River Trent.

Cast
George Whaley as Eddy
Judith Arthy as Julie		
Betty Berrell		
Helen Douglas		
Alan Hopgood as Gary		
Roma Johnstone		
Reg Livermore as Ray
Leslie Wright as army corporal

Production
It was the second Australian TV production from Patrick Barton. Many of the cast were relative newcomers to Australian screens.

It was advertised as "live modern suspense drama".

Reception
The TV critic from the Sydney Morning Herald thought the script was "pointless sensation seeking... more than ordinarily tiresome. Why this weary reshuffling of mildewed dramatic effects in an English setting should have been called worth reproducing in it Melbourne studio is difficult to understand."

References

External links
 

Australian television films
1963 television plays